Liao Wei (born 12 January 1999) is a Chinese footballer currently playing as a midfielder for Hebei China Fortune.

Club career
Liao Wei was promoted to the senior team of Hebei China Fortune within the 2020 Chinese Super League season and would make his debut in a Chinese FA Cup game on 19 September 2020 against Wuhan Zall F.C. in a 1-1 draw that ended in penalty shootout defeat.

Career statistics

References

External links

1999 births
Living people
Chinese footballers
Association football midfielders
Hebei F.C. players